Chetopa Township, Kansas may refer to one of the two following places:

 Chetopa Township, Wilson County, Kansas
 Chetopa Township, Neosho County, Kansas

See also 
 List of Kansas townships

Kansas township disambiguation pages